Netherfield railway station serves the town of Netherfield in the Borough of Gedling in Nottinghamshire, England. It comprises a single island platform with two tracks, with only a single waiting shelter. Access is via a flight of steps down from Chaworth Road, which bridges the line at this point.

History 

The station is located on the line first opened by the Ambergate, Nottingham, Boston and Eastern Junction Railway in 1850 and taken over by the Great Northern Railway.

From 7 January 1963 passenger steam trains between Grantham, Bottesford, Elton and Orston, Aslockton, Bingham, Radcliffe-on-Trent, Netherfield and Colwick, Nottingham London-road (High Level) and Nottingham (Victoria) were replaced with diesel-multiple unit trains. 

The station was renamed from Netherfield & Colwick to Netherfield on 6 May 1974.

The branch then goes under the A612 road, bridges the Nottingham to Lincoln line, crosses over the A612 and terminates at Gedling coal mine.

Current services 
Train services are extremely limited, with just seven "peak time" trains calling at the station on a typical weekday. Three of those trains operate towards Nottingham (with one early service extended to Liverpool), and the remainder operate to Skegness. All trains are operated by East Midlands Railway.

The station used to have a PlusBus scheme where combined train and bus tickets could be bought at a reduced price, however it was withdrawn due to low usage owing to the limited rail services. The locality of Netherfield is still part of the Nottingham Plusbus scheme.

Former services

References

External links 

Site showing the state of the Gedling branch in November 2006

Railway stations in Nottinghamshire
DfT Category F2 stations
Former Great Northern Railway stations
Railway stations in Great Britain opened in 1878
Railway stations served by East Midlands Railway
Thomas Chambers Hine railway stations
Gedling